Terrence Rangi-Tanirau Hepetema (born 3 January 1992) is a New Zealand rugby union player for the Grenoble in Pro D2. His preferred position is centre. His grandfather Anthony Hepetema played for the Māori All Blacks.

Hepetema has previously played for Randwick and the Waratahs in Australia.  In September 2013 he signed for Leicester Tigers in England where he stayed for two years before returning to New Zealand to join the Bay of Plenty Steamers.

On 7 February 2022, Hepetema would leave London Irish to move to France to join Grenoble in the Pro D2 competition from the 2022-23 season.

References

External links
Rugby profile

1992 births
Living people
New Zealand rugby union players
Blues (Super Rugby) players
Leicester Tigers players
Rugby union centres
Rugby union players from Harrow, London